The Las Vegas Nevada Temple is the 43rd operating temple of the Church of Jesus Christ of Latter-day Saints (LDS Church). The temple was announced by church leaders in April 1984.

History
A groundbreaking ceremony and site dedication for the temple were held in November 1985. Gordon B. Hinckley, then a counselor in the church's First Presidency, presided and gave the dedication prayer. Construction began soon after the ceremony.

After construction was completed, the temple was open to the public for tours between November 16 and December 9, 1989. Almost 300,000 toured the temple and its grounds during these three weeks. At the top of this tower stands a ten-foot statue of the angel Moroni. The exterior is a white finish of pre-cast stone walls with a copper roof. The temple has 192 rooms, which includes four ordinance rooms, a Celestial room, six sealing rooms, a baptismal font, and other facilities to meet the needs of the purposes of the temple. The temple serves church members in the southern part of Nevada and surrounding areas in California and Arizona.

Hinckley dedicated the Las Vegas Nevada Temple in sessions held December 16–18, 1989. Eleven sessions were held and more than 30,000 Latter-day Saints attended the dedicatory services. The temple was dedicated as "an oasis of peace and light."

In 2020, the Las Vegas Nevada Temple was closed in response to the coronavirus pandemic.

See also

 Comparison of temples of The Church of Jesus Christ of Latter-day Saints
 Temple (Latter Day Saints)
 List of temples of The Church of Jesus Christ of Latter-day Saints by geographic region
 Temple architecture (Latter-day Saints)
 The Church of Jesus Christ of Latter-day Saints in Nevada

References

External links
 
Las Vegas Nevada Temple Official site
Las Vegas Nevada Temple at ChurchofJesusChristTemples.org

20th-century Latter Day Saint temples
Buildings and structures in Sunrise Manor, Nevada
The Church of Jesus Christ of Latter-day Saints in Nevada
Religious buildings and structures in Nevada
Religious buildings and structures completed in 1989
Temples (LDS Church) in Nevada
1989 establishments in Nevada